Jean-Pierre Bonnefoux (born 9 April 1943, in Bourg en Bresse, France) is a French ballet dancer and instructor. He is the former artistic director of the Charlotte Ballet and the Chautauqua Institution.

At 14, Bonnefoux joined the Paris Opera Ballet, and became a star dancer at age 21. Under the direction of George Balanchine, Bonnefoux became a principal dancer with the New York City Ballet.

He has served twice as the President of the Jury at the Prix de Lausanne (2005 and 2007).
 
He, his wife Patricia McBride, and two children reside in Charlotte, North Carolina.

Filmography

References

External links 
 

Ballet teachers
New York City Ballet principal dancers
New York City Ballet Diamond Project choreographers
Ballet choreographers
Paris Opera Ballet étoiles
Choreographers of New York City Ballet
Living people
1943 births
Dance in North Carolina
Ballets by Jean-Pierre Bonnefoux